1st Infantry Division, was an infantry division in the National Army of the Azerbaijan Democratic Republic.

History 
The division was originally formed in late 1917. Formation of the division was carried out by its commander, Khalil bey Talyshkinski. Although the division was structured within the Azerbaijani Special Corps. However, because the formation of Azerbaijani military units did not meet the necessary requirements, ASC and the 1st Infantry Division were disorganized and units within these structures were subordinated to the Islamic Army of the Caucasus on August 13, 1918. The reorganization of the infantry divisions and ASC started after the successful liberation of Baku. Colonel Jamil Jahid Bey was appointed commander of the division, and the 1st, 2nd and 3rd infantry regiments joined the division on September 23, 1918. The 9th Infantry Regiment of the 5th Caucasian Infantry Division of the Caucasus Army Group also joined this division in order to accelerate its reorganization. Major General Ibrahim agha Usubov from Karabakh was appointed the commander of the division after the Ottoman army left Azerbaijan in mid-November 1918. Nevertheless, Major General Suleyman bey Efendiyev was appointed the commander of the division on January 1, 1919. Javad bey Shikhlinsky was appointed the commander of the division after the death of Efendiyev on February 21, 1919. By the decision of the Council of Ministers dated June 25, 1919, Javad bey Shikhlinsky was awarded the rank of Major General for his services in the formation and strengthening of the division. 1st Javanshir, 2nd Zagatala and 3rd Ganja infantry regiments were part of the division and they were situated in Ganja. The regiments of the division were usually in line of contact with the Armenian forces. They fought in Zangezur, Karabakh, and took part in consolidation of the northern defense systems. After the Operation Baku in 1920, 1st and 2nd infantry divisions were merged into Unified Red Division of the Workers and Peasants by the order of the People's Military and Naval Commissar on May 16, 1920.

See also 
 Müsüslü Military Detachment

References

Sources 
 
 

Military units and formations of Azerbaijan
Divisions (military units)
Military of the Azerbaijan Democratic Republic